Zingaretti is an Italian surname. Notable people with the surname include:

Luca Zingaretti (born 1961), Italian actor and film director
Nicola Zingaretti (born 1965), Italian politician, brother of Luca

Italian-language surnames